Pollone is a comune (municipality) in the Province of Biella in the Italian region Piedmont, located about  northeast of Turin and about  west of Biella. 
Pollone borders the following municipalities: Biella, Fontainemore, Lillianes, Occhieppo Superiore, Sordevolo.

References

Cities and towns in Piedmont